The International Bamboo and Rattan Organization (INBAR) is an independent intergovernmental organization established in 1997 to develop and promote innovative solutions to poverty and environmental sustainability using bamboo and rattan.

History
INBAR evolved from an informal network of bamboo and rattan researchers set up in 1984 by the International Development Research Centre (IDRC) of Canada. The name "International Network for Bamboo and Rattan" was chosen in 1993.  Work to launch INBAR as an independent organization started in 1995, and was completed in 1997 when INBAR became an independent organization with its headquarters in Beijing, China. Bangladesh, Canada, China, Indonesia, Myanmar, Nepal, Peru, the Philippines and the United Republic of Tanzania made up INBAR's nine founding members. Since then, INBAR has grown considerably in strength and scope away from a research-only organization and towards a more action-focused mandate. In November 2016 the name of the organization was changed to International Bamboo and Rattan Organization to reflect this change.

Membership and structure
Membership of INBAR is open to member states of the United Nations and to intergovernmental organizations. INBAR currently has 48 Member States. INBAR's supreme governing body is its Council of representatives of its Member States, which meets biennially. The Board of Trustees, made up of appointed experts from relevant fields from many countries, is the second tier of governance, and develops appropriate policies, oversees management and ensures efficient operations at its annual meetings.

The Director General is a member of the Board of Trustees and is responsible for day-to-day running of the organization. The current Director General is Ambassador Ali Mchumo.

INBAR's headquarters is in Beijing, China, and it has regional offices in South Asia (New Delhi, India), Central Africa (Yaoundé, Cameroon), East Africa (Addis Ababa, Ethiopia), West Africa (Kumasi, Ghana) and Latin America and the Caribbean (Quito, Ecuador). INBAR is managed by its Executive Management team, which comprises the Director General, Deputy Director General, and the Directors of Global Program, Membership Affairs, Host Country Affairs, and Communications.

Member States as of July 2021

Argentina
Bangladesh
Benin
Bhutan
Brazil
Burundi
Cambodia
Cameroon
Canada
Central African Republic
China
Chile
Colombia
Republic of the Congo
Cuba
Ecuador
Eritrea
Ethiopia
Fiji
Ghana
India
Indonesia
Jamaica
Kenya
Liberia
Madagascar
Malawi
Malaysia
Mozambique
Myanmar
Nepal
Nigeria
Pakistan
Panama
Peru
Philippines
Rwanda
Senegal
Sierra Leone
Sri Lanka
Suriname
Tanzania
Thailand
Togo
Tonga
Uganda
Venezuela
Viet Nam

Publications
INBAR publishes a wide range of publications on bamboo and rattan., including: 
Manual for the Sustainable Management of Bamboo
Bamboo for land restoration
Bamboo and Rattan Yellow Pages
Road from the Global Bamboo and Rattan Congress 2018
INBAR Strategy 2015-2013: From Research to Development
Carbon Sequestration and Carbon Emissions Reduction Through Bamboo Forests and Products

INBAR also publishes a series of fact sheets for the general public about issues related to bamboo and rattan.
Think Bamboo for Land Restoration
Why is Bamboo important for the Belt and Road Initiative?
Why is Bamboo important for Climate Change?
Bamboo, Rattan and Biodiversity
Bamboo as a Source of Bioenergy
Bamboo and the Circular Economy

See also
Bamboo
Rattan
Poverty alleviation
Sustainable development
Bamboo construction

References

External links
 

International development organizations
Intergovernmental organizations
Organizations based in Beijing
International organizations based in China
International environmental organizations
United Nations General Assembly observers
Bamboo